Biscogniauxia capnodes a species of fungus in the family Xylariaceae.It is a plant pathogen.

References

Fungi described in 1845
Fungal plant pathogens and diseases
Xylariales
Taxa named by Miles Joseph Berkeley